The Contributions Agency Collection is a collection of British National Insurance stamps that forms part of the British Library Philatelic Collections.

See also
Cinderella stamps
H.M. Stationery Office Collection
Revenue stamps of the United Kingdom
Revenue Society

External links
The National Archives: Ministry of Labour and Ministry of National Insurance: National Insurance Stamps, correspondence.

British Library Philatelic Collections
Revenue stamps
Philately of the United Kingdom
Cinderella stamps
Taxation in the United Kingdom